This is a list of Chinese football transfers for the 2022 season winter transfer window.

Super League

Beijing Guoan

In:

Out:

Cangzhou Mighty Lions

In:

Out:

Changchun Yatai

In:

Out:

Chengdu Rongcheng

In:

Out:

Dalian Pro

In:

Out:

Guangzhou City

In:

Out:

Henan Songshan Longmen

In:

Out:

Kunshan

In:

Out:

Meizhou Hakka

In:

Out:

Nantong Zhiyun

In:

Out:

Qingdao Hainiu

In:

Out:

Shandong Taishan

In:

Out:

Shanghai Port

In:

Out:

Shanghai Shenhua

In:

Out:

Shenzhen

In:

Out:

Tianjin Jinmen Tiger

In:

Out:

Wuhan Three Towns

In:

Out:

Zhejiang

In:

Out:

League One

Beijing BSU

In:

Out:

Dandong Tengyue

In:

Out:

Guangxi Pingguo Haliao

In:

Out:

Guangzhou

In:

Out:

Hebei

In:

Out:

Heilongjiang Ice City

In:

Out:

Jiangxi Beidamen

In:

Out:

Jinan Xingzhou

In:

Out:

Liaoning Shenyang Urban

In:

Out:

Nanjing City

In:

Out:

Qingdao Youth Island

In:

Out:

Shaanxi Chang'an Athletic

In:

Out:

Shanghai Jiading Huilong

In:

Out:

Shijiazhuang Gongfu

In:

Out:

Sichuan Jiuniu

In:

Out:

Suzhou Dongwu

In:

Out:

Yanbian Longding

In:

Out:

Zibo Cuju

In:

Out:

League Two

Beijing BIT

In:

Out:

Chongqing Tongliangloong

In:

Out:

Dalian Duxing

In:

Out:

Dongguan United

In:

Out:

Fuzhou Hengxing

In:

Out:

Guangxi Lanhang

In:

Out:

Hainan Star

In:

Out:

Hubei Istar

In:

Out:

Hunan Billows

In:

Out:

Jiangxi Dark Horse Junior

In:

Out:

Nantong Haimen Codion

In:

Out:

Qingdao Red Lions

In:

Out:

Quanzhou Yassin

In:

Out:

Shaoxing Shangyu Pterosaur

In:

Out:

Tai'an Tiankuang

In:

Out:

Wuhan Jiangcheng

In:

Out:

Wuxi Wugo

In:

Out:

Yuxi Yukun

In:

Out:

Zhuhai Qin'ao

In:

Out:

Zibo Qisheng

In:

Out:

Dissolved

Wuhan Yangtze River

In:

Out:

Xinjiang Tianshan Leopard

In:

Out:

References

2023
China